The quantum Boltzmann equation, also known as the Uehling-Uhlenbeck equation, is the quantum mechanical modification of the Boltzmann equation, which gives the nonequilibrium time evolution of a gas of quantum-mechanically interacting particles. Typically, the quantum Boltzmann equation is given as only the “collision term” of the full Boltzmann equation, giving the change of the momentum distribution of a locally homogeneous gas, but not the drift and diffusion in space. It was originally formulated by L.W. Nordheim (1928), and by and E. A. Uehling and George Uhlenbeck (1933).

In full generality (including the p-space and x-space drift terms, which are often neglected) the equation is represented analogously to the Boltzmann equation.

The quantum Boltzmann equation gives irreversible behavior, and therefore an arrow of time; that is, after a long enough time it gives an equilibrium distribution which no longer changes. Although quantum mechanics is microscopically time-reversible, the quantum Boltzmann equation gives irreversible behavior because phase information is discarded only the average occupation number of the quantum states is kept. The solution of the quantum Boltzmann equation is therefore a good approximation to the exact behavior of the system on time scales short compared to the Poincaré recurrence time, which is usually not a severe limitation, because the Poincaré recurrence time can be many times the age of the universe even in small systems.

The quantum Boltzmann equation has been verified by direct comparison to time-resolved experimental measurements, and in general has found much use in semiconductor optics. For example, the energy distribution of a gas of excitons as a function of time (in picoseconds), measured using a streak camera, has been shown to approach an equilibrium Maxwell-Boltzmann distribution.

Application to semiconductor physics 
A typical model of a semiconductor may be built on the assumptions that:
 The electron distribution is spatially homogeneous to a reasonable approximation (so all x-dependence may be suppressed)
 The external potential is a function only of position and isotropic in p-space, and so  may be set to zero without losing any further generality
 The gas is sufficiently dilute that three-body interactions between electrons may be ignored.

References 

Statistical mechanics